HPI (acronym for , a French alternative term for giftedness) is a French-Belgian crime-comedy television series.

Created by  Stéphane Carrié, Alice Chegaray-Breugnot and Nicolas Jean, broadcast in Belgium at La Une, since , in Switzerland at RTS Un, since , and in France at TF1, since , the series is a coproduction between Itinéraire Productions, Septembre Productions, TF1, Pictanovo, Be-Films and  RTBF.

It stars Audrey Fleurot as Morgane Alvaro, an intellectually highly gifted housekeeper, who becomes a consultant for the DIPJ (a police division that investigates serious crime) in Lille, and helps solve several cases thanks to her sharp mind.

Synopsis 
Morgane is 38 years old and has 3 children from 2 ex-husbands. Alone, she has to manage her family life in difficult conditions. But she is highly gifted. She has an IQ of 160 and a good dose of insubordination. Her destiny as a housemaid is turned upside down when her extraordinary abilities are spotted by the Lille police, who offer her a job as a consultant. But Morgane has a problem with authority.

Cast

Main cast 

 Audrey Fleurot : Morgane Alvaro
 Cypriane Gardin : Théa Alvaro
 Noé Vandevoorde : Eliott Alvaro
 Mehdi Nebbou : Adam Karadec
 Bruno Sanches : Gilles Vandraud
 Marie Denarnaud : Céline Hazan
 Bérangère McNeese : Daphné Forestier

Supporting cast 

 Rufus : Henri (episodes 1, 2, 3 and 5)
 Cédric Chevalme : Ludovic Mulier (episodes 1, 7 and 8)
 Christopher Bayemi : Doctor Bonnemain (episodes 1, 3, 4, 6, 7 and 8)
 Akache Busiah : Ranir (episodes 1, 7 and 4)
 Michèle Moretti : Agnès Alvaro (episodes 3, 4 and 6)
 Omar Mebrouk : Sofiane Karadec (episodes 6 and 8)

International adaptation
ABC ordered a pilot to a U.S. adaptation and ABC Signature will produce.

References

External links 
 HPI on tf1.fr
 HPI on rtbf.be
 HPI on rts.ch

 

French police procedural television series
2020s French comedy television series
2021 French television series debuts
Crime comedy television series
TF1 original programming
Television shows set in France
French-language television shows
La Une original programming